Genoplesium ruppii, commonly known as Rupp's midge orchid, is a species of small terrestrial orchid that is endemic to eastern Australia. It has a single thin leaf fused to the flowering stem and up to twenty five small, hairy green flowers with a purple labellum.

Description
There is a small callus in the centre of the labellum and extending about half way to its tip. Flowering occurs between January and April.

Taxonomy and naming
Rupp's midge orchid was first formally described in 1927 by Richard Sanders Rogers who gave it the name Prasophyllum ruppii. The type specimen was collected near Paterson by Herman Rupp and the description was published in Transactions and Proceedings of the Royal Society of South Australia. In 2001, David Jones changed the name to Genoplesium ruppii and in 2002 Jones and Mark Clements changed the name again to Corunastylis ruppii, but the latter name change is not accepted by the Australian Plant Census.

Distribution and habitat
Genoplesium ruppii grows in swampy and grassy sites and in heathy forest.

References

ruppii
Endemic orchids of Australia
Orchids of New South Wales
Plants described in 1927